The 1951 UN Commission for the Unification and Rehabilitation of Korea (UNCURK) occurred as part of the Korean War. Many of the participating nations include those who participated in the United Nations Command.

It was disbanded in 1973.

References

See also
UNCMAC - the UN Command Military Armistice Commission
UNCOK - the UN Commission on Korea
Neutral Nations Supervisory Commission - the international Korean Armistice Agreement monitoring entity

United Nations operations in Asia
North Korea–South Korea border
Aftermath of the Korean War
Military units and formations established in 1951
1951 establishments in South Korea